The Sibley–Ahlquist taxonomy is a  bird taxonomy proposed by Charles Sibley and Jon E. Ahlquist. It is based on DNA–DNA hybridization studies conducted in the late 1970s and throughout the 1980s.

DNA–DNA hybridization is among a class of comparative techniques in molecular biology that produce distance data (versus character data) and that can be analyzed to produce phylogenetic reconstructions only using phenetic tree-building algorithms.  In DNA–DNA hybridization, the percent similarity of DNA between two species is estimated by the reduction in hydrogen bonding between nucleotides of imperfectly complemented heteroduplex DNA (i.e., double stranded DNAs that are experimentally produced from single strands of two different species), compared with perfectly matched homoduplex DNA (both strands of DNA from the same species).

Characteristics
The classification appears to be an early example of cladistic classification because it codifies many intermediate levels of taxa: the "trunk" of the family tree is the class Aves, which branches into subclasses, which branch into infraclasses, and then "parvclasses", superorders, orders, suborders, infraorders, "parvorders", superfamilies, families, subfamilies, tribes, subtribes and finally genera and species. However the classification study did not employ modern cladistic methods, as it relies strictly on DNA-DNA hybridization as the sole measure of similarity.

The Sibley–Ahlquist arrangement differs greatly from the more traditional approach used in the Clements taxonomy.

Showing major changes from Clements, the Sibley–Ahlquist orders are as follows:
 Enlarged Struthioniformes replaces  the ratite orders Rheiformes (rheas), Casuariiformes (cassowaries and emus), and Apterygiformes (kiwis) and Struthioniformes (ostriches).
 Tinamiformes (tinamous) is unchanged.
 A greatly enlarged Ciconiiformes includes the previous Sphenisciformes (penguins), Gaviiformes (divers), Podicipediformes (grebes), Procellariiformes (tubenoses), Pelecaniformes (pelicans and allies), Ciconiiformes (storks and allies), Falconiformes (birds of prey), Charadriiformes (waders, gulls, terns, and auks), and the family Pteroclidae (sandgrouse).
 Anseriformes (ducks and allies) is unchanged.
 Modified Galliformes landfowl. Chachalacas moved to Craciformes.
 New Craciformes chachalacas etc. Previously part of Galliformes.
 New Ralliformes rails and crakes.  Previously part of Gruiformes
 Modified Gruiformes Cranes. Rails and button-quails moved to Ralliformes and Turniciformes, respectively.
 New Turniciformes button-quails etc. Previously part of Gruiformes.
 Modified Columbiformes doves.  Sandgrouse moved to Ciconiiformes.
  Psittaciformes   cockatoos and parrots unchanged.
 New Musophagiformes turacos. Previously  part of Cuculiformes.
 Modified Cuculiformes cuckoos. Turacos moved to Musophagiformes.
 Modified Strigiformes owls. Enlarged to include Caprimulgiformes (nightjars, owlet-nightjars, frogmouths, oilbirds, potoos).
 Modified Apodiformes swifts. Hummingbirds moved to Trochiliformes.
 New Trochiliformes hummingbirds. Previously part of Apodiformes.
  Coliiformes mousebirds unchanged.
  Trogoniformes trogons unchanged.
 Modified  Coraciiformes rollers.
 New  Upupiformes Hoopoe. Previously part of Coraciiformes.
 New  Bucerotiformes hornbills. Previously  part of Coraciiformes.
 New  Galbuliformes jacamars and puffbirds. Previously part of Piciformes.
 Modified  Piciformes woodpeckers
 Passeriformes perching birds unchanged.

Some of these changes are minor adjustments.  For instance, instead of putting the swifts, treeswifts, and hummingbirds in the same order that includes nothing else, Sibley and Ahlquist put them in the same superorder that includes nothing else, consisting of one order for the hummingbirds and another for the swifts and treeswifts.  In other words, they still regard the swifts as the hummingbirds' closest relatives.

Other changes are much more drastic.  The penguins were traditionally regarded as distant from all other living birds.  For instance, Wetmore put them in a superorder by themselves, with all other non-ratite birds in a different superorder.  Sibley and Ahlquist, though, put penguins in the same superfamily as divers (loons), tubenoses, and frigatebirds. According to their phylogenetic analysis, penguins are closer to those birds than herons are to storks.

The Galloanseres (waterfowl and landfowl) has found widespread acceptance. The DNA evidence of Sibley–Ahlquist for the monophyly of the group is supported by the discovery of the fossil bird Vegavis iaai, an essentially modern but most peculiar waterfowl that lived near Cape Horn some 66-68 million years ago, still in the age of the dinosaurs.<ref>Clarke et al.' (2005)</ref>

Classification

See also
 Molecular phylogenetics
 Phylogenetic nomenclature
 Charles Sibley
 Sibley–Monroe checklist
 List of birds (based on the Clements taxonomy)

References

  (2005): Definitive fossil evidence for the extant avian radiation in the Cretaceous. Nature 433: 305–308.  PDF fulltext Supporting information
 Sibley, Charles Gald & Ahlquist, Jon Edward (1990): Phylogeny and classification of birds. Yale University Press, New Haven, Conn.
On the Phylogeny and Classification of Living Birds, by Charles G. Sibley
The Early History of Modern Birds Inferred from DNA Sequences of Nuclear and Mitochondrial Ribosomal Genes, by Marcel van Tuinen, Charles G. Sibley, and S. Blair Hedges
Sibley's Classification of Birds, by Eric Salzman, Birding'', December 1993.  The Web version lacks the illustrations, which show parts of the family tree, and includes only a partial bibliography, but adds a sequence down to the tribe level with detail on intermediate taxa (especially for the passerines). Archived version

Systems of animal taxonomy
Ornithology